Jefferis is a surname, and may refer to:

 Albert W. Jefferis (1868–1942), a Nebraska Republican politician
 Barbara Jefferis (1917–2004), an Australian author
 Barbara Jefferis Award
 Frank Jefferis (1884–1938), English (soccer) footballer
 James Jefferis (1833–1917), an English Congregational minister with a considerable career in Australia, grandfather of Barbara
 Joshua Jefferis (born 1985), Australian artistic gymnast
 Millis Jefferis (1899–1963), founder of a special unit of the British Ministry of Supply for developing unusual weapons during WWII
 Vaughn Jefferis (born 1961), New Zealand equestrian
 William W. Jefferis (1820–1906), American mineralogist